Nalan Xingde (January 19, 1655 – July 1, 1685), Manchu name Nara Singde, courtesy name Rongruo, was a Qing dynasty Chinese poet, famous for his ci poetry. He was born Nalan Chengde (納蘭成德), but had to change his name when the Kangxi Emperor named Yunreng his crown prince. The character cheng (成) became taboo because it was phonetic part of Yunreng's birth name.

Born in Beijing in January 1655, Nalan Xingde came from a powerful Manchu family that not only belonged to the Plain Yellow Banner of the Eight Banners, but was also related to royalty. His father Mingju, who became Grand Secretary in 1677, was second cousin to the Shunzhi Emperor, and his mother was the fifth daughter of Ajige, Prince Ying of the First Rank, and thus first cousin to the Shunzhi Emperor. Xingde's genealogical origins could have been Mongolian, however, since his clan was originally a tribe of the Mongol Yehe who defeated the Manchu Nara tribe and adopted their name.

He was reportedly a bright child with a talent in writing poetry and essays. Like all Manchu boys, however, he was also taught riding and archery, and was said to be quite proficient in both.

By nineteen, he was already enjoying a literary reputation. However, success at the national civil service examination eluded him until 1676, when he obtained the Chin-shih Degree. In contrast to the more common practice of naming a chin-shih a bureaucrat/official, the Kangxi Emperor gave Xingde a military position as a junior grade officer in the Imperial Bodyguard (三等侍衛).

Xingde became a close associate of the emperor, perhaps due to their similar ages, and often accompanied the emperor on royal tours of inspection. Later, Xingde was promoted to a higher position (一等侍衛). He was sent on a tour of the northern border to assess the damage caused by the Russian border raids and skirmishes.

He died at the age of 30, due to an unspecified illness.

When he was 19, he married the daughter of Lu Xingzu (盧興祖), who was the Viceroy of Guangdong. Three years into the marriage, his wife died in childbirth. He later took a concubine whose family name was Yan (顏) and eventually married a woman whose family name was Guan (官). At thirty, he took another concubine, Shen Wan (沈宛), who was a poet of some standing herself. He had at least three sons and several daughters.

One of the daughters of Nalan Xingde was married to Han Bannerman Nian Gengyao.

Character
Nalan was born with great talent in literature. Though his supernormal background has paved the way for his political career, it also controlled his freedom. So in Nalan's mind, he is tired of his position, freedom is the pursuit of his life. Coming from a rich family, Nalan does not value the material comforts, literature is his favorite. His dear wife's death made him painful and pessimistic, and intensified his eagerness to get close to nature.

In fiction and popular culture
 Portrayed by Stephen Wong Ka-lok in The Life and Times of a Sentinel (2011)

References 

 Bruce Carpenter, 'Drinking Water; Lyric Songs of the Seventeenth Century Manchu Poet Na-lan Hsing-te' Bulletin of Tezukayama University (Tezukayama daigaku kiyo), Nara, Japan, 1983, no. 20, pp. 100–137.
 Martin Gimm, ‘Nalan Xingde (1655-1685). Zwanzig Gedichte‘, in: Hefte für Ostasiatische Literatur, 25, 1999, 45-53.

External links

 Nalan Xingde Memorial Hall at Shangzhuang

Manchu Plain Yellow Bannermen
Manchu politicians
Qing dynasty poets
Qing dynasty politicians from Beijing
1655 births
1685 deaths
Poets from Beijing
Qing dynasty classicists